Amherst County is a county, located in the Piedmont region and near the center of the Commonwealth of Virginia in the United States.  The county is part of the Lynchburg Metropolitan Statistical Area, and its county seat is also named Amherst.

Amherst County was created in 1761 out of Albemarle County, and it was named in honor of Lord Jeffery Amherst, the so-called "Conqueror of Canada".  In 1807 as population increased, the county was reduced in size in order to form Nelson County.  Tobacco was the major cash crop of the county during its early years. The labor-intensive crop was worked and processed by enslaved Africans and African Americans before the American Civil War.

As of the 2020 census, the population of the county was 31,307.

History 

Beginning thousands of years in the past, Native Americans were the first humans to populate the area. They hunted and fished mainly along the countless rivers and streams in the county. With the establishment of the Virginia Colony in 1607, English emigrants arrived in North America. By the late 17th century English explorers and traders had traveled up the James River to this area. Early trading posts were established between 1710 and 1720. By 1730, many new English colonial families moved into the area currently known as Amherst County, drawn by the desire for land and the good tobacco-growing soil.

Amherst County was formed in 1761, from part of southwestern Albemarle County.  The original county seat had been in Cabelsville, now Colleen, in what would later become Nelson County. The county was named for Lord Amherst, known as the "Conqueror of Canada", who commanded the British forces that successfully secured Canada from the French during the Seven Years' War. Jeffery Amherst had previously been named as Governor of Virginia, although he never came to this colony.

In 1806 the county took its present proportions, when Nelson County was formed from its northern half. At that point, the county seat was moved to the village of Five Oaks, later renamed Amherst. The present county courthouse was built in 1870 and has served the county ever since. Amherst County produced more Confederate soldiers per capita than anywhere else in the Confederate States of America.

In the early days, the major crop raised in Amherst County was tobacco.  Apple orchards were part of mixed farming that replaced tobacco, especially in the late 19th century. Timber, mining and milling were also important industries. The introduction of the railroad in the late 19th century greatly influenced the county's growth. The county contains many good examples of 18th, 19th and early 20th century rural and small town architecture. The downtown area of Amherst is a classic example of early 20th century commercial architecture.

Recreation and attractions

Recreational attractions are located throughout the county. There are four recreational and public lakes, namely Mill Creek, Thrashers Lake, Otter Lake and Stonehouse Lake, which offer opportunities to fish, canoe or kayak.  There are many parks and trails in the county, including about 25 miles of the Appalachian Trail, which runs through the George Washington National Forest. Offshoot trails lead to peaks in Amherst, such at Mount Pleasant, Cole Mountain, and Tar Jacket Ridge.

Festivals in the area
 Rebec Vineyard's Garlic Festival
 Lazy Days Vineyard's Summer Solstice Festival
 Amherst County Sorghum Festival
 The Batteau Festival

Geography

Adjacent counties / Independent city
 Rockbridge County – northwest
 Nelson County – northeast
 Appomattox County – southeast
 Campbell County – south
 Lynchburg – south (independent city)
 Bedford County – southwest

National protected areas
 Blue Ridge Parkway (part)
 George Washington National Forest (part)

Major highways
  (N & S Amherst Hwy, S. Amherst Hwy is US BUS 29 south of Amherst and then turns into the Lynchburg Expressway in Madison Heights; Monacan Trail)
  (Lexington Turnpike; Richmond Hwy)
  (joins SR 130 and becomes Elon Rd.)
  (Elon Rd; Amelon Hwy)
  (Patrick Henry Hwy)
  (S Amherst Hwy)
  (Old Town Connector)

Demographics

2020 census

Note: the US Census treats Hispanic/Latino as an ethnic category. This table excludes Latinos from the racial categories and assigns them to a separate category. Hispanics/Latinos can be of any race.

2000 Census
As of the census of 2000, there were 31,894 people, 11,941 households, and 8,645 families residing in the county.  The population density was 67 people per square mile (26/km2).  There were 12,958 housing units at an average density of 27 per square mile (11/km2).  The racial makeup of the county was 77.67% White, 19.79% Black or African American, 0.81% Native American, 0.35% Asian, 0.02% Pacific Islander, 0.41% from other races, and 0.94% from two or more races.  0.96% of the population were Hispanic or Latino of any race.

There were 11,941 households, out of which 31.70% had children under the age of 18 living with them, 56.00% were married couples living together, 12.40% had a female householder with no husband present, and 27.60% were non-families. 24.00% of all households were made up of individuals, and 9.90% had someone living alone who was 65 years of age or older.  The average household size was 2.51 and the average family size was 2.95.

In the county, the population was spread out, with 23.50% under the age of 18, 9.70% from 18 to 24, 27.70% from 25 to 44, 25.30% from 45 to 64, and 13.80% who were 65 years of age or older.  The median age was 38 years. For every 100 females there were 91.10 males.  For every 100 females age 18 and over, there were 87.10 males.

The median income for a household in the county was $37,393, and the median income for a family was $42,876. Males had a median income of $31,493 versus $22,155 for females. The per capita income for the county was $16,952.  About 8.00% of families and 10.70% of the population were below the poverty line, including 13.20% of those under age 18 and 11.60% of those age 65 or over.

Government
The Board of Supervisors are elected from single-member districts.

Board of Supervisors
 District 1: Tom Martin
 District 2: Claudia D. Tucker (R)
 District 3: L. J. "Jimmy" Ayers
 District 4: David Pugh, Jr.
 District 5: Drew Wade (R)

Constitutional officers
 Clerk of the Circuit Court: Deborah C. Mozingo
 Commissioner of the Revenue: Jane Irby (I)
 Commonwealth's Attorney: W. Lyle Carver
 Sheriff: E.W. Viar Jr. (I)
 Treasurer: Joanne Carden

Amherst County is represented by Republican Tom A. Garrett, Jr. in the Virginia Senate, Republican T. Scott Garrett and Republican Ronnie R. Campbell in the Virginia House of Delegates, and Republican Ben Cline in the U.S. House of Representatives.

Education
Amherst County is served by Amherst County Public Schools, which operates one central high school, two middle schools, and several elementary schools.  Temple Christian School is a private school located on the grounds of Temple Baptist Church.  Sweet Briar College is also located in Amherst County, just south of the town of Amherst.

Communities

Town
 Amherst

Census-designated place
 Madison Heights

Other unincorporated communities
 Clifford
 Elon
 Sweet Briar
 Monroe
 Riverville
 Stapleton

Notable residents
 James John Floyd (1750-1783), born in Amherst County. co-founder of Louisville, KY and early settler in that area. Kentucky Colonel and pioneer judge. Among several places named for him is Floyd Street in Louisville.
 William Barnett (1761–1834), born in Amherst County, United States Congressman
 William Becknell, born in Amherst County, first white man to open what would become the Santa Fe Trail
 Samuel Jordan Cabell (1756–1818), born in Amherst County, United States Congressman
 Peter Cartwright (1785–1872), born in Amherst County, noted "hellfire and brimstone" preacher
 Powhatan Ellis, (1790–1863), born in Amherst County, justice of the Mississippi Supreme Court, United States Senator from Mississippi, and minister to Mexico.  Ellisville, Mississippi, is named in his honor.
 David S. Garland (1769–1841), Congressman, master of the Brick House (Clifford, Virginia), founder of the New Glasgow Academy.
 Ottie Cline Powell (1890–1894), born in Amherst County four-year-old boy who died after getting lost collecting firewood outside his schoolhouse. There is an urban legend that Ottie haunts the area where he died.

See also
 National Register of Historic Places listings in Amherst County, Virginia

References

 
Virginia counties
1761 establishments in Virginia
Counties on the James River (Virginia)
Populated places established in 1761